Water polo was contested for men only at the 1990 Central American and Caribbean Games in Mexico City, Mexico.

References
 

1990 Central American and Caribbean Games
1990
1990 in water polo